Falmouth is a census-designated place (CDP) within the town of Falmouth in Cumberland County, Maine, United States. The population was 1,855 at the 2010 census. It is part of the Portland–South Portland–Biddeford, Maine Metropolitan Statistical Area.

Geography

The Falmouth CDP is centered along U.S. Route 1 in the southeastern part of the town of Falmouth, and is bordered to the north by the CDP of Falmouth Foreside, to the east by Casco Bay, to the south by the city of Portland, and to the west by the tidal arm of the Presumpscot River and by Interstate 295.

Demographics

References

Census-designated places in Cumberland County, Maine
.
Portland metropolitan area, Maine
Census-designated places in Maine